Clymenia may refer to:
 Clymenia (ammonite), an ammonite genus in the family Clymeniidae
 Clymenia (plant), a flowering plant genus in the family Rutaceae